Alvania lanciae is a species of minute sea snail, a marine gastropod mollusc or micromollusk in the family Rissoidae.

Description

Distribution

References

 Gofas, S.; Le Renard, J.; Bouchet, P. (2001). Mollusca. in: Costello, M.J. et al. (eds), European Register of Marine Species: a check-list of the marine species in Europe and a bibliography of guides to their identification. Patrimoines Naturels. 50: 180-213.

External links
 Calcara, P. (1845). Cenno sui molluschi viventi e fossili della Sicilia da servire da supplimento ed insieme di critiche osservazioni all'opera di R.A. Philippi. Stamperia Reale, Palermo, 65 pp., pl. 1-4
 Monterosato T. A. (di) (1883-1885). Conchiglie littorali mediterranee. Naturalista Siciliano, Palermo, 3(3): 87-91 (1883); 3(4): 102-111; 3(5): 137-140; 3(6): 159-163; 3(8): 227-231; 3(10): 277-281; 4(1-2): 21-25; 4(3): 60-63 (1884); 4(4): 80-84; 4(8): 200-204 (1885)
 Locard A. & Caziot E. (1900-1901). Les coquilles marines des côtes de Corse. Annales de la Société Linnéenne de Lyon, 46: 193-274 [1900; 47: 1-80, 159-291 [1901 ]

Rissoidae
Gastropods described in 1845